The Ambassador of the Republic of Turkey to the Republic of the Philippines is Republic of Turkey's foremost diplomatic representative in the Philippines. As head of Turkey's diplomatic mission there, the Ambassador is the official representative of the President and the Government of Turkey to the President and Government of the Philippines.

Although the diplomatic relations between two countries were established in 1949, the Turkish embassy in the Philippines was established on October 17, 1990.

Heads of mission

References

External links

Philippines
Turkey